Myles Anderson (born 9 January 1990) is an English professional footballer who plays as a defender for Beaconsfield Town. Anderson has been at several clubs in his career, having played in Scotland, England and Italy.

Early and personal life
Born in Westminster, Anderson is the son of football agent Jerome Anderson.

Career
Anderson moved from his youth club of Leyton Orient to Aberdeen in January 2011. He made his professional debut on 19 February 2011, in a Scottish Premier League match against Kilmarnock. In March 2011, Anderson signed a pre-contract with Blackburn Rovers, effective from 1 July 2011.

Anderson joined Aldershot Town on loan in August 2012. He left Blackburn on 4 January 2013 after having his contract terminated by mutual consent. He signed for Exeter City three days later. Anderson's time at Exeter was also short, and on 20 August 2013, he signed for Italian club Monza. After a season at Monza, Anderson joined Lega Pro side Pro Patria on loan in August 2014. After six months on loan at Pro Patria, on 1 February 2015 he Anderson moved to Serie A side Chievo. On 21 July 2015, Anderson returned to Lega Pro, leaving Chievo for L'Aquila. On 29 January 2016, Anderson joined fellow Lega Pro side Lupa Castelli Romani on loan for the remainder of the season. By the time he left Italy after three years in the country, Anderson considered himself fluent in the language.

Anderson signed for Barrow in October 2016, before moving to Torquay United in February 2017. He signed a new contract with Torquay in June 2017.

He signed on loan from Chester in November 2017. After his contract with Torquay was mutual terminated on 5 February 2018, he signed a permanent deal with Chester three days later.

After leaving Chester, he signed for Hartlepool United in May 2018. Anderson signed a new deal with Hartlepool in May 2019 with Pools boss Craig Hignett describing him as a "model professional". Anderson signed for Aldershot Town on loan on 25 November 2019. Anderson was released from his contract at the end of the 2019–20 season.

On 31 August 2020, Anderson joined newly-promoted National League side Weymouth after leaving Hartlepool United. He joined Hampton & Richmond Borough on loan on 30 October 2020. He left Weymouth at the end of the 2020–21 season having made just 2 appearances. Following a successful loan spell, Anderson joined Hampton & Richmond Borough on a permanent deal in July 2021.

Following his departure from Hampton & Richmond, Anderson joined Braintree Town ahead of their league tie against Hungerford Town, which eventually resulted in a 2–0 defeat for the Iron.

In November 2022, Anderson signed for Beaconsfield Town, making his debut against Aylesbury Vale Dynamos.

Career statistics

References

1990 births
Living people
Footballers from Westminster
English footballers
Association football defenders
Leyton Orient F.C. players
Aberdeen F.C. players
Blackburn Rovers F.C. players
Aldershot Town F.C. players
Exeter City F.C. players
A.C. Monza players
Aurora Pro Patria 1919 players
A.C. ChievoVerona players
L'Aquila Calcio 1927 players
S.S. Racing Club Roma players
Barrow A.F.C. players
Torquay United F.C. players
Chester F.C. players
Hartlepool United F.C. players
Weymouth F.C. players
Hampton & Richmond Borough F.C. players
Braintree Town F.C. players
Beaconsfield Town F.C. players
Scottish Premier League players
English Football League players
Serie C players
National League (English football) players
English expatriate footballers
English expatriate sportspeople in Italy
Expatriate footballers in Italy